Dampfriemen is a 1980 single by the German band La Düsseldorf. Following the success of their previous single - Rheinita - La Düsseldorf were in high demand in Germany, and so decided to release a Christmas single. This arguably led to their downfall, as both Dampfriemen and Individuellos - the associated album - failed to meet the same success commercially.

Release and content

Dampfriemen was released in advance of Christmas 1980 (Individuellos was released on New Year's Eve), and was intended as a Christmas single. However, the A-side - whilst definitely light-hearted and comedic - is not explicitly festive and has no lyrics, perhaps contributing to its failure. Kazoos and percussion instruments feature prominently in the song, as well as the band's signature synthesizers. It was the first La Düsseldorf single to be credited to someone other than Klaus Dinger - Dinger's brother Thomas also receiving recognition. Musically, the sound owes much to traditional German Oom-pah.

The B-side - "Individuellos" - is vocal, featuring lyrics in both German and English. It differs slightly from the album version in that the segue into "Menschen 2" is removed. The single's cover art moves away from the sparse covers of Silver Cloud and Rheinita, hinting at the chaotic covers of future Dinger albums like Cha Cha 2000 - Live in Tokyo or Live As Hippie-Punks.

In the UK the single was released by Albion Records in 1981, with "Tintarella Di..." replacing "Individuellos" as the B-side.

Track listings

German 7" & 12" singles
 "Dampfriemen" - 3:33 (Klaus Dinger / Thomas Dinger)
 "Individuellos" - 3:07 (K. Dinger)

UK 7" single
 "Dampfriemen" - 3:33 (K. Dinger / T. Dinger)
 "Tintarella Di..." - 4:42 (T. Dinger)

Personnel

 Klaus Dinger - kazoo, percussion, synthesizer, vocals
 Thomas Dinger - kazoo, percussion, synthesizer, vocals
 Hans Lampe - drums

1980 songs
Songs written by Klaus Dinger